Wang Taeng (died 1112) was a Goryeo Royal Prince as the sixth son of King Munjong and Queen Inye, also a Buddhist monk under the name Dosaeng (as Wang Taeng) and/or Boeung (as Wang Gyu).

In 1070, under his father, King Munjong's command, Wang shaved his hair and became a monk by starting a new life in Solli Temple (속리사) before went to Hyeonhwa Temple in Gaegyeong and became his maternal uncle, Sohyeon (소현)'s disciple. Then, he served as an abbot in Beopju Temple. In 1084, Wang repaired the Bokcheon Hermitage (복천암 극락보전) and served as an abbot in Geumsan Temple following Sohyeon's death in 1095, even contributed for the temple's development and maintenance. Since he was able to done this, Wang was believed to have a lot of wealth throughout his lifetime and gave it generously to others.

In 1112 (7th years reign of his nephew), some people reported that Wang, along with Kim In-seok (김인석), Yi Yeo-rim (이여림), Ha Eon-seok (하언석), Im Sin-haeng (임신행), and many others were plotting a treason. They then exiled to Geoje and those who were involved (even Kim, Yi, Ha, Im's sons were exiled and decapitated midway), so Wang was also considered to died at this time too.

References

External links 
Wang Taeng on Encykorea .
Wang Taeng on Goryeosa .

Goryeo Buddhist monks
Year of birth unknown
1112 deaths
11th-century Buddhist monks
Korean princes